Montecarlo is an unincorporated community and coal town in Wyoming County, West Virginia, United States.

References 

Unincorporated communities in Wyoming County, West Virginia
Unincorporated communities in West Virginia
Coal towns in West Virginia